Apichai Munotsa (born 25 February 1992), is a Thai professional footballer as a forward.

References

External links

Apichai Munotsa at svenskfotboll.se 
Apichai Munotsa at lagstatistik.se 

1992 births
Living people
Association football forwards
Apichai Munotsa
Apichai Munotsa
Swedish people of Thai descent
Apichai Munotsa
Swedish footballers
BW 90 IF players
Kvarnsvedens IK players
Apichai Munotsa
Apichai Munotsa
Apichai Munotsa
Thai expatriate sportspeople in Sweden